The Casa Rull is a building  located at Carrer de Sant Joan, 27, 43201 in Reus, Catalonia, Spain. The building was designed in 1900 by the Modernist architect Lluís Domènech i Montaner and commissioned by the notary Pere Rull i Trilla of Reus. In 1996, it was renovated by the local architect Joan Figuerola.

The building is in the Modernist style and has architectural, historical, artistic, cultural and social importance. It is adjacent to another Modernist building designed by Lluís Domènech i Muntaner, the Casa Gasull. Nowadays, as a public building of the city council, some cultural events take part in the building and the garden surrounding the building.

See also 
 Lluís Domènech i Montaner
 Reus
 Modernisme

References

Modernisme architecture in Reus
Buildings and structures in Reus
Houses completed in 1901
Lluís Domènech i Montaner buildings
Art Nouveau houses
Houses in Catalonia